The Anne Arundel County Sheriff's Office (AASO) is the law enforcement arm of the court, serving the citizens of Anne Arundel County, Maryland. All deputy sheriffs are certified law enforcement officials with full authority of arrest.

History
The AASO was organized in 1650. John Norwood was appointed the first Sheriff and was paid in pounds of tobacco for services rendered (e.g., serving any writ such as a warrant, tending prisoners, collecting taxes, etc.). In 1776, with the formation of the Maryland Constitution, the Sheriff became an elected position with an initial term lasting one year. The term was then changed to three years, then two, and finally four years in 1926 where it remains today.

In 2016, county leaders asked sheriff Ron Bateman to resign after he was charged with assault following a domestic dispute with his wife. He stayed on until 2018.

In 2022, a sergeant allegedly assaulted a woman in a parking lot. Despite being aware of the allegations, the Sheriff's Office took no action. After a few days a deputy informed the Anne Arundel County Police of the incident and the police arrested the sergeant.

Duties
The duties of the AASO are to enforce writs of the court, maintain the county warrants, extradite prisoners from foreign jurisdictions, transport prisoners between holding facilities and the courts, and maintain courtroom decorum. The AASO is also charged with assisting other law enforcement agencies as needed.

Organization
The current Sheriff is Everett Sesker, serving his first term. He is the first Black sheriff of Anne Arundel County.

The AASO is divided into two bureaus:
the Security Bureau headed by Capt. LaPlanche. The Security Bureau is responsible for courtroom security, holding prisoners, and transporting prisoners.
the Operations Bureau headed by Capt. Gilbert-Duran. The Operations Bureau is responsible for Sheriff communications, serving writs of the court (e.g., protective orders, peace orders, criminal summons, landlord & tenant orders, warrants, etc.)

Fallen officers 

Since the establishment of the Anne Arundel County Sheriff's Office, one officer has died while on duty.

See also 

 List of law enforcement agencies in Maryland

References

External links
Anne Arundel County Sheriff's Office homepage

Sheriff's Office
Sheriffs' offices of Maryland
1650 establishments in Maryland